Hellelujah is the sixth studio album by American rock band Drowning Pool. It was released on February 5, 2016 by Entertainment One Music and was produced by Jason Suecof. It is the second Drowning Pool album recorded with vocalist Jasen Moreno. "By the Blood", the first single from the album, was released on November 19, 2015, while the album artwork was revealed the following day.

The album was recorded throughout 2015. Three singles were released before the album's release: "By the Blood", "Snake Charmer" and "Hell to Pay".

Track listing

Personnel 
Drowning Pool
 Jasen Moreno – vocals
 C.J. Pierce – guitars
 Stevie Benton – bass
 Mike Luce – drums

Production
 Jason Suecof – producer, engineer, mixing
 Audio Hammer Studios – primary production studio
 RavensNest Studio – additional production studio
 C.J. Pierce – additional production and engineering
 John Douglass – mix engineer, additional engineering 
 Alan Douches - mastering
 West West Side - mastering location
 Brian Mercer – album cover design
 Paul Grosso – creative direction
 Sean Marlowe – art direction and design 
 Colt Coan – photography

Singles

References 

2016 albums
Drowning Pool albums
E1 Music albums
Albums produced by Jason Suecof